Catamachilis constricta is a species of jumping bristletail in the family Machilidae.

References

Further reading

 
 
 

Archaeognatha
Articles created by Qbugbot
Insects described in 1905